Harazpey-ye Jonubi Rural District is a rural district (dehestan) in the Central District of Amol County, Mazandaran Province, Iran. At the 2019 census, its population was 21,012, in 6,377 families. The rural district has 13 villages.

References 

Rural Districts of Mazandaran Province
Amol County